Condadito is the smallest of the forty subbarrios of Santurce, San Juan, Puerto Rico.

Demographics
In 2000, Condadito had a population of 748.

In 2010, Condadito had a population of 629 and a population density of 20,966.7 persons per square mile.

Gallery

See also 

 List of communities in Puerto Rico

References

Santurce, San Juan, Puerto Rico
Municipality of San Juan